This is a list of tennis players who have represented the Zimbabwe Davis Cup team in an official Davis Cup match. Zimbabwe have taken part in the competition since 1963. They were known as Rhodesia until 1981

Players

References

Lists of Davis Cup tennis players
Davis Cup